Baek Sung-dong (or  ;  born 13 August 1991) is a South Korean football striker who plays for K League 2 side FC Anyang.

Career
In 2007, Baek participated in the Youth Project of Watford F.C. on the recommendation of the Korea Football Association. He was capped four times for the national team representing them in the 2011 FIFA U-20 World Cup. Following his good performances in the competitions, South Korean under-23 team coach Hong Myung-bo included him in the national squad.

On 29 December 2011, Baek signed his first professional contract with J1 League club Júbilo Iwata, agreeing a three-year deal with the club.

In 2012, he was part of the South Korean team that won bronze at the Summer Olympics.

Career statistics

Club
Updated to 23 February 2016.

1Includes Promotion Playoffs to J1.

References

External links

Baek Sung-dong – National Team stats at KFA 

1991 births
Living people
South Korean footballers
Association football forwards
South Korea international footballers
South Korean expatriate footballers
J1 League players
J2 League players
K League 2 players
Júbilo Iwata players
Sagan Tosu players
V-Varen Nagasaki players
Suwon FC players
Gyeongnam FC players
FC Anyang players
Expatriate footballers in Japan
South Korean expatriate sportspeople in Japan
Yonsei University alumni
Footballers at the 2012 Summer Olympics
Olympic footballers of South Korea
Olympic medalists in football
Olympic bronze medalists for South Korea
Medalists at the 2012 Summer Olympics
Sportspeople from Gwangju